The Empire Women's Indoor are a series of tournaments for professional female tennis players played on indoor hardcourts. The events are classified as $60,000 and $25,000 ITF Women's World Tennis Tour tournaments and have been held in Trnava, Slovakia, since 2015.

Past finals

Singles

Doubles

External links
 ITF search
 Official website

ITF Women's World Tennis Tour
Hard court tennis tournaments
Tennis tournaments in Slovakia
2015 establishments in Slovakia
Recurring sporting events established in 2015